Chiure or Chiure Novo is a town in Chiure District in Cabo Delgado Province in northeastern Mozambique.

It is the capital of Chiure District.
The District has the highest population of all Districts in Cabo Delgado province.
Construction of a district hospital was completed in 2009.

The local population is predominantly Makua. Portuguese is widely spoken in the district Capital as it is the official language of Mozambique, but in outlying towns and villages Emakua may be the only spoken language.

References 

Republica de Mocambique, Ministerio da Administracao Estatal, Perfil do Distrito de Chiure, 2005
https://web.archive.org/web/20120610054454/http://www.portaldogoverno.gov.mz/Informacao/distritos/cdelgado/Chiure.pdf

External links 
Satellite map at Maplandia.com 

Populated places in Ancuabe District